Poo poo, or variants, may refer to:

Art, entertainment, and media
 PooPoo, a character in the film National Lampoon's Pledge This!
 PuPu, a fictional piglet
 Pupu Tupuna, a fictional rabbit

Other uses
 Feces, sometimes called "poo poo"
 Poo Poo Point, a bare shoulder of West Tiger Mountain in Washington, U.S.
 Pooh-pooh, a fallacy in informal logic
 Pu pu platter, tray of American Chinese cuisine

See also
 Poo (disambiguation)
 Poop (disambiguation)
 Pooh (disambiguation)
 Poupou (disambiguation)
 Pupupu, setting for the Manga series Kirby of the Stars
 Te Waikoropupū Springs, also known as Pupu Springs